CONFIRM was an ambitious IT project supposed to create a single computer reservations system/global distribution system used by airline, rental car, and hotel companies. It is often used as a case study as an example of a major failure in project management.

History

The system was pursued to develop in order to create synergies between AMR, Marriott, Hilton Hotels Corporation and Budget Rent-A-Car and fully integrate and unify the reservation systems of the companies involved.

In 1988 the four large corporations made contracts to complete the system by June 1992 project at a cost of $55 million. Unfortunately, the project turned out to be much more complex to finish than the partners had anticipated. They all had high hopes based that AMR would expand on the extremely successful SABRE computer reservation system that had helped American Airlines create a sustainable competitive advantage after the deregulation of the airline industry. In April 1992, just three months before the system was intended to go live, Confirm failed tests at Los Angeles-based Hilton. AMR also told its partners that it needed another 15 to 18 months to complete the system. The project was never completed. In the process more than 500 technical personnel worked on the project; when the partners disbanded the project in July 1992 they had spent three and a half years and $125 million on the project.

The technical complexity of this project was extreme. CONFIRM runs on two IBM 3090 mainframes. One houses the central reservations system, which runs under Transaction Processing Facility. The other mainframe houses a DB2 relational database in an MVS (an IBM mainframe operating system) environment. The database contains decision-support information such as customer histories and pricing data. The system required application-to-application bridging between the two mainframes (CPUs/IBM 3090) for some 60 applications. The main problem was to tie CONFIRM's transaction-processing facility-based central reservation system with its decision support system. Hilton users found that the system's user interface, mainframe transaction processing and mainframe database did not adequately communicate with one another. Other problems included different programming languages and difficulties with recovering databases in event of crashes. These problems were not insurmountable, but they would delay the project for about two extra years.

In September 1992 AMR (American Airlines) sued Marriott, Hilton and Budget, alleging they caused CONFIRM's failure by withholding funds, making poor staffing assignment and withdrawing prematurely. The three partners countersued.

In January 1994 American Airlines reached out-of court settlements with all of its partners for undisclosed amounts.

See also
 Real-time operating system - SABRE was one of the first such systems

Further reading

References

Travel technology
Computer reservation systems